Strangers with Candy is an American comedy television series produced by Comedy Central. It first aired on April 7, 1999, and concluded its third and final season on October 2, 2000. Its timeslot was Sundays at 10:00 p.m. (ET). A prequel film of the same name was released in 2006. As of 2022, it is available to watch on Paramount+.

Plot
The series' main character, Geraldine Antonia "Jerri" Blank (played by Amy Sedaris), was a "junkie whore"/runaway returning to high school as a freshman at age 46 at the fictional Flatpoint High School (home of the Concrete Donkeys) in the town of Flatpoint.

Jerri ran away from home and became "a boozer, a user, and a loser" after dropping out of high school as a teenager, supporting her drug habits through prostitution, stripping, and larceny. She has been to prison several times, the last time because she "stole the TV."

Every episode features a warped theme or moral lesson and ends with the cast and other featured actors from the episode dancing. The last episode features Flatpoint being turned into a strip mall because the show was cancelled to make room for a TV show called Strip Mall.

Development

The series was first envisioned by Amy Sedaris as a parody of after school specials. While she was putting together a pitch for her series, her friends Paul Dinello and Stephen Colbert watched a bootleg copy of a Scared Straight!–type public-service film called The Trip Back, in which motivational speaker Florrie Fisher recalled (among other things) her days as a New York prostitute to a group of high-school students. Seeing that Fisher strongly resembled their friend Amy Sedaris, they showed her a copy of the tape and, suitably impressed with Sedaris's imitation of Fisher, began developing a series based around the idea of Fisher going back to high school herself. Much of Jerri's past is taken from anecdotes in The Trip Back, some of which are also in Fisher's autobiography, The Lonely Trip Back. Several lines of dialogue in the series were taken verbatim from Fisher's public-service film.

Sedaris, Colbert, Dinello, and Rouse were cast members of the short-lived Comedy Central series Exit 57. They, along with Greg Hollimon and many other stars of the series, were also alumni of Chicago's Second City comedy troupe.  Every script was written by Sedaris and Dinello as a team, very occasionally working with a collaborator such as Rouse or Thomas Lennon.  Colbert received a co-writing credit on the unaired pilot (and later, on the prequel movie), but he did not work as a writer on the series proper.

Cast and characters

The Blank family
 Geraldine "Jerri" Antonia Blank (Amy Sedaris): A 46-year-old ex-con, ex-junkie, ex-prostitute, and high-school freshman at Flatpoint High.
 Guy Blank (Roberto Gari): Jerri's biological father, shown only in a motionless state during mid-action.
 Sara Blank (Deborah Rush): Jerri's hateful stepmother.
 Derrick Blank (Larc Spies): Jerri's arrogant teenage half-brother. He plays quarterback for the Flatpoint Donkeys football team.
 Stew (David Pasquesi): The Blank family's meat man. He engages in an affair with Sara while remaining married to the mother of his two children (Chuck and Patty).

Flatpoint High faculty and staff
 Principal Onyx Blackman (Greg Hollimon): Principal of Flatpoint High School.  His image is prominently displayed around the school, in classrooms, lockers, and even paper towels.
 Charles "Chuck" Noblet (Stephen Colbert): Chuck is the school's history teacher and sponsor of the school newspaper, The Donkey Trouser. He and his wife Claire have a son, Seamus. He is in a secret sexual relationship with Geoffrey Jellineck.
 Geoffrey Jellineck (Paul Dinello): Geoffrey (pronounced JOFF-ree as opposed to the conventional JEFF-ree) is the school's art teacher. He is an emotionally fragile and narcissistic man who is engaged in a secret homosexual relationship with Chuck Noblet.
 Coach Cherri Wolf (Sarah Thyre): The girls' gym teacher.
 Iris Puffybush (Dolores Duffy): Secretary to Principal Blackman (and, as implied on several occasions, "much, much more").
 Cassie Pines (Janeane Garofalo): The school's guidance counselor.

Flatpoint High students
 Tammi Littlenut (Maria Thayer): Jerri's red-headed friend, who is often referred to as "Copperhead".
 Orlando Pinatubo (Orlando Pabotoy): Jerri's Filipino sidekick, about whose heritage she makes many racist remarks. It is insinuated in both the series and film that he is in love with Jerri.
 Jimmy Tickles (Jack Ferver): Jerri's sexually diminutive date in The Virgin Jerri; later a recurring character.
 Paul Cotton (Jared Ryan): Jerri's love interest who gets to see her "Liberty Bell" in Let Freedom Ring.

Miscellaneous
 Claire Noblet (Carolyn Popp): Wife to Chuck Noblet. She is oblivious to her husband's relationship with Geoffrey Jellineck.
 Father (Alan Tudyk): Local cult leader, whose cult threatens Blackman's hold on his Flatpoint students.

Episodes

Film adaptation

On February 7, 2006, film company ThinkFilm announced that it had acquired the distribution rights to a feature film based on the series. The film, a prequel to the television show, was completed in 2004 and acquired by Warner Independent at Sundance in 2005, but release of the film was delayed due to legal clearance issues. Amy Sedaris, Stephen Colbert, and Paul Dinello reprised their roles for the film; several other characters were recast because the actors who played them now looked too old to be in high school. In addition to acting, Colbert is a co-producer and Dinello is a director for the film. Worldwide Pants, a production company owned by comedian David Letterman, was also a producer. This is the company's first feature film production. A teaser trailer for the film was released in April 2006.

The initial theatrical release was June 28, 2006, in the New York City area, followed by the remainder of the United States on July 7. A DVD of the film was released in November 2006. Amy Sedaris said of Jerri Blank that "she's like a rash; you never know when she's going to pop up."

Reception
In 2007, Strangers with Candy was ranked #30 on TV Guide's Top Cult Shows Ever.

References

External links

 
  

Comedy Central original programming
1999 American television series debuts
2000 American television series endings
1990s American comedy television series
2000s American comedy television series
1990s American high school television series
2000s American high school television series
Stephen Colbert
Television shows set in New Jersey